The following is an overview of events in 2006, including the highest-grossing films, award ceremonies and festivals, a list of films released and notable deaths. Pixar celebrated its 20th anniversary in 2006 with the release of its 7th film, Cars.

Evaluation of the year
Legendary film critic Philip French of The Guardian described 2006 as "an outstanding year for British cinema". He went on to emphasize, "Six of our well-established directors have made highly individual films of real distinction: Michael Winterbottom's A Cock and Bull Story, Ken Loach's Palme d'Or winner The Wind That Shakes the Barley, Christopher Nolan's The Prestige, Stephen Frears's The Queen, Paul Greengrass's United 93 and Nicholas Hytner's The History Boys. Two young directors made confident debuts, both offering a jaundiced view of contemporary Britain: Andrea Arnold's Red Road and Paul Andrew Williams's London to Brighton. In addition the gifted Mexican Alfonso Cuaron came here to make the dystopian thriller Children of Men." He also stated, "In the (United) States, M. Night Shyamalan of The Sixth Sense fame fell flat on his over-confident face with Lady in the Water, but Martin Scorsese's The Departed was his best for years, and he was with Jack Nicholson at last. Apart from that, the best American films were political (Syriana, Good Night, and Good Luck, The New World) or very personal (Little Miss Sunshine, Little Children, The Squid and the Whale). Sadly, Oliver Stone's 9/11 picture World Trade Center was neither. Asian cinema produced a string of elegant thrillers and horror flicks. The best Eastern European movie was The Death of Mr Lazarescu, a devastating look at the Romania Ceausescu left behind him. Most of the best Western European films came from France, with Michael Haneke's Hidden (Cache), proving the most widely discussed art-house puzzle picture since Last Year at Marienbad. The award of 18 certificates by the BBFC to Shortbus and Destricted has brought close the abolition of censorship, but not of classification, and Ang Lee's Brokeback Mountain was a real step forward for the representation of homosexuals in mainstream cinema, though Gore Vidal claims that there's a gay subtext to every western. However, the year's most extraordinary event, or conjunction, was the almost simultaneous release of Tommy Lee Jones's directorial debut The Three Burials of Melquiades Estrada and Al Gore's documentary An Inconvenient Truth. Who would have predicted in the Sixties, when they were roommates at Harvard and used by Erich Segal as joint models for Oliver Barrett IV in Love Story, that both Jones and Gore would end up as movie stars - if, in Gore's case, accidentally and temporarily?"

Highest-grossing films

The top 10 films released in 2006 by worldwide gross are as follows:

Box office records 

 Pirates of the Caribbean: Dead Man's Chest became the third film in cinema history to gross over $1 billion and is the 35th highest-grossing film of all time.

Events

Awards

Films released in 2006 
The list of films released in 2006, arranged by country, are as follows:
 American films
 Argentine films
 Australian films
 Bengali films
 Bollywood films
 Brazilian films
 British films
 French films
 Hong Kong films
 Italian films
 Japanese films
List of Kannada films of 2006
Malayalam films
 Mexican films
 Pakistani films
 Russian films
 South Korean films
 Spanish films
 Tamil films
 Telugu films

Births
 April 20 - Kailia Posey, American actress and reality television show contestant (died 2022)
 April 22 - Nathanael Saleh, English actor
 April 29 - Xochitl Gomez, American actress
 June 25 – Mckenna Grace, American actress
 June 29 - Sam Lavagnino, American voice actor and YouTuber
 September 7 - Ian Chen (actor), American actor
 September 12 - Alexander Molony, British actor
 September 17 - Ella Jay Basco, American actress
 October 1 - Priah Ferguson, American actress
 October 5 – Jacob Tremblay, Canadian actor
 December 9 - Pixie Davies, English actress

Deaths

Film Debuts 

 Aziz Ansari – School for Scoundrels
 Dave Bautista – Relative Strangers
 Jon Bernthal – World Trade Center
 Rachel Bilson – The Last Kiss
 Katie Cassidy – When a Stranger Calls
 Dan Fogler – School for Scoundrels
 Bill Hader – Doogal
 Rebecca Hall – Starter for 10
 Armie Hammer – Flicka
 Jennifer Hudson – Dreamgirls
 Kane – See No Evil
 Simone Aaberg Kærn – Smiling in a War Zone
 Rami Malek – Night at the Museum
 Eddie Redmayne – Like Minds
 Mia Wasikowska – Suburban Mayhem
 Ed Westwick – Children of Men

References

External links
 Box Office Mojo film release schedule.

 
Film by year